The Aero-Club des Cheminots Aerofer was a French-built light utility aircraft of the mid-1950s.

Design and development

The Aerofer was designed and built by members of the Aero-Club des Cheminots as a co-operative project. It was a small single-seat low-winged aircraft. The Aerofer had a two-spar wooden wing with fabric covering. The fuselage was of wooden construction with a combination of fabric and plywood covering.  The tailwheel undercarriage was fixed. The aircraft was powered by a 50 h.p. Walter Mikron four-cylinder air-cooled engine built by Aster.

Operational history

The Aerofer was completed in 1954 and was operated until 1964 by the members of the Aero-Club des Cheminots, based at Guyancourt airfield (now closed) to the west of Paris. Its extremely small dimensions meant that it was semi-aerobatic, despite the low-powered engine fitted. Only one example of the design was completed.

By 1965 the aircraft, registered as F-PERS with a Certificat de Navigabilite Restreint d'Aeronef (CNRA) was owned by the Aero-Club Etienne Boileau and based at Fontenay-Tresigny airfield. It was no longer on the CNRA register by March 1983.

Specifications

Notes

References

1950s French civil utility aircraft
Low-wing aircraft
Single-engined tractor aircraft
Aircraft first flown in 1954